The XVII Grand Prix d'Albi was a motor race, run to Formula One rules, held on 29 May 1955 at Circuit Les Planques, Albi. The race was run over 105 laps of the circuit, and was won by French driver André Simon in a Maserati 250F. Simon also set pole and fastest lap.

This was the last occasion of the Grand Prix d'Albi being run for Formula One cars, and the last race at Circuit des Planques, which was replaced by the Circuit d'Albi in 1962.

Results

References

Albi Grand Prix